Supersunnyspeedgraphic, the LP is a remixed compilation album by Ben Folds which was released on 24 October 2006, by Epic Records in the United States.  The album's name is taken from Folds' EPs Super D, Sunny 16 and Speed Graphic.  Music from those EPs make up the majority of the album, alongside other tracks released since Folds' last album: a cover of the Dr. Dre track "Bitches Ain't Shit", the song "Bruised" from The Bens, and the reprise version of "Still" from the Over the Hedge soundtrack.

Due to an outcry on many sites (including Folds' own MySpace webpage) that Folds was releasing this "LP" of previously released material as a marketing ploy, he released a statement concerning the new release.  He clarified that, while they are the same songs from the EP collection, almost every track would utilize added overlays and instrumentation (strings, for instance) or different takes of the song. From an email to his mailing list: "the new LP would be 'boasting remastering and tweaking that was completed at Ben's own studio in Nashville, TN'".

The second U.S. single "Bitches Ain't Shit" made it onto the Hot 100 as well as the Hot Digital Tracks chart.

Track listing

2006 compilation albums
Ben Folds albums
Epic Records compilation albums
Albums produced by Ben Folds